Vue Harbor East is a high-rise hotel building located in Baltimore, Maryland, United States. The building rises , containing 30 floors and 131 rooms. The construction of the building began in 2005 and was completed in 2007. The developers of the building were Beatty Harvey Fillat Architects.

The construction of this building is a part of the building span that is currently taking place in Harbor East, Baltimore. By 2010, more than 800 condominiums are expected to be built. Vue Harbor East is also a part of the Hilton Hotel chain. The building is the twenty-third tallest building in the city of Baltimore. A feature of the hotel is a seven-screen movie theater built into the hotel building.

See also
List of tallest buildings in Baltimore

References

External links
Description of project
Harbor Vue East Condominiums website

Hotel buildings completed in 2007
Skyscraper hotels in Baltimore
Hilton Hotels & Resorts hotels
Inner Harbor East, Baltimore